Getting the wind knocked out of you is an idiom that refers to the difficulty of breathing and temporary paralysis of the diaphragm caused by reflex diaphragmatic spasm when sudden force is applied to the upper central region of the abdomen and solar plexus. This often happens in contact sports, from a forceful blow to the abdomen, or by falling on the back.

The sensation of being unable to breathe can lead to anxiety and there may be residual pain from the original blow, but the condition typically clears spontaneously in a minute or two. Victims of such a "winding" episode often groan in a strained manner until normal breathing resumes. Loosening restrictive garments and flexing the hips and knees can help relieve the symptoms.

References

Further reading 
 
 
 "Getting the Wind Knocked Out of You" at kidshealth.org

Slang
English-language idioms
Breathing abnormalities
Motor control
Injuries of abdomen, lower back, lumbar spine and pelvis
Sports injuries